Timothée Joseph Pembélé (born 9 September 2002) is a French professional footballer who plays as a defender for Ligue 1 club Paris Saint-Germain.

Club career

Paris Saint-Germain 
Pembélé joined the Paris Saint-Germain Academy at the age of 13 in 2015, having spent the previous seven years of his youth career at US Persan 03. On 4 July 2018, at the age of 15, he signed his first professional contract with Paris Saint-Germain (PSG), tying him to the club until 30 June 2021.

2020–21: Debut season 
On 28 November 2020, Pembélé made his professional debut in a 2–2 Ligue 1 draw against Bordeaux, starting as a right center-back in a pairing with Presnel Kimpembe. Despite scoring an own goal at the tenth minute of the match, Pembélé's performance was regarded by most observers as a very promising one. He made good use of his speed and vision in defense, recovering the ball on several occasions, and helped his team move forward in attack with several successful vertical passes. At one point in the match, he dribbled a distance of 40 meters with the ball, leading to a corner for PSG. On 4 December 2020, Pembélé extended his contract with PSG to 2024. He made his UEFA Champions League debut five days later, coming on as a substitute for Alessandro Florenzi in a 5–1 win against İstanbul Başakşehir. Pembélé’s first goal for Paris Saint-Germain came in a 4–0 victory over Strasbourg on 23 December.

2021–22: Loan to Bordeaux 
On 10 August 2021, Pembélé joined Bordeaux on a season-long loan with an option-to-buy. He scored in his debut match, a 2–2 league draw against Marseille. On 19 December 2021, he scored the first brace of his career in a 10–0 Coupe de France win over Jumeaux de M'zouazia. On 10 April 2022, he suffered an anterior cruciate ligament (ACL) injury in a match against Metz, effectively his last match of the season. It was confirmed on 9 June 2022 that he would leave Bordeaux following the expiration of his loan deal.

2022–23: Return from injury 
Pembélé was out injured for the first part of the 2022–23 season, due to an ACL injury he had suffered in April 2022. After nine months on the sidelines, he made his return to play in a friendly game on 19 January 2023, coming on as a substitute in a 5–4 win over the hybrid Riyadh Season Team. His first official match back from injury was a start in a 7–0 Coupe de France victory over Pays de Cassel on 23 January. Pembélé made his return to play in Ligue 1 in a 3–1 defeat to Monaco on 11 February.

International career 
Pembélé has represented France at U16, U17, and U18 level. He made a total of 6 appearances at the 2019 FIFA U-17 World Cup, a tournament in which France finished third. 

On 2 July 2021, Pembélé was included in the 21-player list selected to represent France at the 2020 Summer Olympics.

Style of play 
Having played different positions such as right-back, left-back, and center-back, Pembélé has been described as being a versatile defender. In an interview with ArchySport, he stated that he prefers to play on the right side of defence. "I really like to attack, to defend well too. This side in general is where I feel best," said Pembélé. He is right-footed.

According to Culture PSG, Pembélé is a quick player equipped with good technique, and he constantly brings an offensive threat on his side of the pitch. He boasts above-average skills in reading the game, which has helped him when repositioning on the field during matches. Pembélé is adept at stealing the ball of attackers with his pace and tenacity, using his technique to turn while hugging the touchline, and accelerating past the opponent he was marking moments earlier.

Personal life 
Pembélé was born in Beaumont-sur-Oise in France. He is of Congolese descent.

Career statistics

Honours 
Paris Saint-Germain
 Coupe de France: 2020–21
 Trophée des Champions: 2020

France U17
 FIFA U-17 World Cup third place: 2019
Individual

 UEFA European Under-17 Championship Team of the Tournament: 2019

References

External links 

 Profile at the Paris Saint-Germain F.C. website
 
 
 
 
 
 

2002 births
Living people
People from Beaumont-sur-Oise
French footballers
France youth international footballers
Association football defenders
Association football utility players
Paris Saint-Germain F.C. players
FC Girondins de Bordeaux players
Ligue 1 players
Black French sportspeople
French sportspeople of Democratic Republic of the Congo descent
Olympic footballers of France
Footballers at the 2020 Summer Olympics
Footballers from Val-d'Oise